The surname Tichy may refer to:

Tichý (surname), a Czech-language surname

Brian Tichy (born 1968), American drummer
Ekkehard Tichy, German Luftwaffe ace 
Gérard Tichy (1920–1992), Spanish actor
Hans Tichy (1861–1925), Austrian painter
Herbert Tichy (1912–1987), Austrian author, geologist, journalist and climber
Katerina Tichy (born 1974), Canadian Olympic alpine skier
Lajos Tichy (1935–1999), Hungarian footballer
Lester C. Tichy (1905–1981), American modern architect
Mattias Tichy (born 1974), Swedish rower
Noel Tichy, American management consultant, author and educator
Robert F. Tichy (born 1957), Austrian mathematician
Roland Tichy (born 1955), German economist, writer and journalist
Susan Tichy (born 1952), American poet 
Walter F. Tichy (born 1952), German professor of computer science

Fictional characters 
Ijon Tichy, a fictional character by Polish science fiction writer Stanisław Lem

See also
 

Surnames of Czech origin
de:Tichy